Patricia Anne "Pat" Eastwood  (born 16 December 1947) is a South African figure skater. She represented South Africa at the 1960 Winter Olympics where she placed 25th. She was 12 years old at the time.

References

 Sports-reference profile

South African female single skaters
1947 births
Living people
Olympic figure skaters of South Africa
Figure skaters at the 1960 Winter Olympics